The Embassy of the United States to Bahrain is the diplomatic mission of the United States in Bahrain. The building is located in Zinj, a district of the capital, Manama. The post of U.S. Ambassador to Bahrain is currently held by Steven C. Bondy.

The embassy is one of two major American installations in Bahrain, the other being Naval Support Activity Bahrain, a base which houses the main United States Navy operations in the Persian Gulf.

History
The embassy was dedicated on 4 July 1990 and occupied in December that year. The building was constructed in accordance with Department of State security requirements.

Embassy sections
The following is a list of the sections and offices housed within the embassy.

U.S. Citizen Services
Visa Services
United States Commercial Service
Information Resource Center
Regional English Language Office
Public Affairs
Educational Advisor

Protests
Bahraini citizens and activists have protested outside of the embassy for various reasons, including anti-Iraq War demonstrations, the presence of the U.S. Navy's Fifth Fleet in Bahrain, and to protest Israeli actions in the Middle East. The U.S. had seen by some as a proxy for the Israeli government when Israel and Bahrain didn't have diplomatic relations.

See also
 Bahrain–United States relations
 Diplomatic missions in Bahrain
 Ambassadors of the United States to Bahrain
 Embassy of Bahrain, Washington, D.C.
 Ambassadors of Bahrain to the United States

References

External links
 Official website

1971 establishments in Bahrain
Manama
Diplomatic missions in Bahrain
Bahrain–United States relations